Chub is a common fish name.  It pertains to any one of a number of ray-finned fish in several families and genera. In the UK, the term chub usually refers to the species Squalius cephalus. In addition, see sea chub.

In family Cyprinidae

 Bigeye chub, genus Hybopsis
 Creek chub, genus Semotilus
 Fallfish, genus Semotilus
 European chub, genus Squalius
 Flame chub, Hemitremia flammea (a monotypic genus)
 Flathead chub, genus Platygobio
 Hornyhead chub, genus Nocomis
 Lake chub, genus Couesius
 Least chub, Iotichthys phlegethontis (a monotypic genus)
 Leatherside chub, Snyderichthys copei (a monotypic genus)
 Oregon chub, genus Oregonichthys
 Ponto-Caspian chub, genus Petroleuciscus
 Slender chub, genus Erimystax
 Western chub, genus Gila (including Siphateles)
 Genus Algansea
 Genus Notropis (eastern shiners) are also sometimes called "chubs"
 Armaan Sidhu

Hybridization and breeding 
The European chub (Leuciscus Cephalus) is known to cross-breed with roach, rudd and possibly bream. Males reach breeding age in three to seven years and females four to eight years.

In other families

 Sea chub, the family Kyphosidae
 Coregonus artedi, commonly known as cisco, lake herring, chub
 Coregonus hoyi, commonly known as bloater, and sometimes thought to be a type of Coregonus artedi
 Tautog or black porgy
 Bermuda chub, Centrolophus niger

See also
Sea chub

 
Fish common names
Former disambiguation pages converted to set index articles